Gregory Long is President Emeritus of  The New York Botanical Garden in the Bronx, New York.

Early years and education
Gregory Long was born in 1946 in Kansas City, Missouri, and raised in Minneapolis, Minnesota. He graduated from New York University in 1969 with a degree in art history with academic interests in the Italian Renaissance, particularly early Renaissance painting and architecture.

Career
He began his career at The Metropolitan Museum of Art in 1969, where he worked as Executive Assistant to the Secretary of the Corporation and President of the Board. He then held positions at the Brooklyn Museum, the  American Museum of Natural History, and the New York Zoological Society  (now the Wildlife Conservation Society ). Throughout the 1980s, he served as Vice President for Public Affairs at The New York Public Library. In 1989 he was elected the eighth President and Chief Executive Officer of the New York Botanical Garden, a position he served in until 2018. During his twenty-nine-year tenure with the New York Botanical Gardens, Long completed more than twenty capital projects, including the Edible Academy. The $28 Million project was built to provide year-round educational opportunities; the Edible Academy consists of high-tech classrooms, a teaching kitchen, a freestanding greenhouse, teaching pavilions, dedicated gardening plots, and an amphitheater. The Edible Academy is one of the most extensive educational programs in the United States, teaching more than 100,000 people yearly about organic gardening and healthy eating.

Publications 
Long is the author of Historic Houses of the Hudson River Valley, published in 2004 by Rizzoli in association with the Preservation League of New York State. He is the editor of The New York Botanical Garden (2016), an illustrated and updated volume documenting the institution’s history and collections. 

 Historic Houses of the Hudson River Valley (2004)
 The New York Botanical Garden (2016, erditor)
 Executive Editor: NYBG Strategic Plans 1993–1999, 2001–2007, 2009–2015, and 2016–2021
 Site Lines: The New York Botanical Garden 
 Gardens of the Hudson Valley, Foreword
 Paradise and Plenty, Foreword
 Rescue and Revival: New York Botanical Garden, 1989–2018 (Library of American Landscape History, 2022)

References

External links 
 “New York Botanical Garden Gets $28M Windfall” Crain’s New York Business
 “Donor of the Day: New York Botanical Garden Gives $28 Million to Celebrate CEO’s Anniversary” The Wall Street Journal
 “The Floral Kingdom in the Bronx” The New York Review of Books
 “A Farewell to Flowers: Botanical Garden’s Leader Steps Down” New York Times
 “The New York Botanical Garden and a Long day’s journey” Financial Times

Living people
Wildlife Conservation Society people
1946 births
New York Botanical Garden